The Buddhist Society of India, known as the Bharatiya Bauddha Mahasabha, is a national Buddhist organization in India. It was founded by B. R. Ambedkar on 4 May 1955 in Mumbai, Maharashtra, India. Ambedkar was the father of the Indian Constitution, polymath, human rights activist and Buddhism revivalist in India. He was first national President of the organization. At a ceremony held on 8 May 1955 in Nare Park, Bombay (now Mumbai), Ambedkar formally announced the establishment of this organization for the spread of Buddhism in India. Its headquarter is in Mumbai. Currently Meeratai Yashwant Ambedkar, the daughter in law of B. R. Ambedkar, is the National President of the Buddhist Society of India and Bhimrao Yashwant Ambedkaris Working President of The Buddhist Society of India.

History

B. R. Ambedkar studied Buddhism all his life. Around 1950, he devoted his attention to Buddhism and travelled to Ceylon (now Sri Lanka) to attend a meeting of the World Fellowship of Buddhists. While dedicating a new Buddhist vihara near Pune, Ambedkar announced he was writing a book on Buddhism, and that when it was finished, he would formally convert to Buddhism. He twice visited Burma (now Myanmar) in 1954; the second time to attend the third conference of the World Fellowship of Buddhists in Rangoon. In July 1951 he formed the "Bharatiya Bauddha Janasangh" (Indian Buddhist People's Organisation), which became the "Bharatiya Bauddha Mahasabha" or the "Buddhist Society of India" in May 1955.

See also
 World Buddhist Sangha Council
 International Buddhist Confederation

References

External links
 
 Battle to head Ambedkar's Buddhist Society of India nears end in the High Court

Religious organizations established in 1955
1955 establishments in Bombay State
Buddhist organisations based in India
B. R. Ambedkar
Navayana
Buddhism in India
Buddhism in Maharashtra